The Dutch Senior Open was a men's golf tournament on the European Senior Tour. It was held at the Royal Haagsche Golf & Country Club in The Hague, Netherlands from 2010 to 2012. In 2013 it moved to The International, Badhoevedorp near Amsterdam. It was the first EST event to be held in the Netherlands since the 2001 Legends in Golf.

Winners

References

External links
Coverage on the European Senior Tour's official site

Former European Senior Tour events
Golf tournaments in the Netherlands
Sports competitions in The Hague
Sports competitions in Amsterdam
Recurring sporting events established in 2010
Recurring sporting events disestablished in 2014
Defunct sports competitions in the Netherlands
Van Lanschot Kempen